This is a list of members of the Tasmanian Legislative Council between 1933 and 1939. Terms of the Legislative Council did not coincide with Legislative Assembly elections, and members served six year terms, with a number of members facing election each year.

Elections

Members

Notes
  On 27 October 1935, James Murdoch, the member for Pembroke, died. His brother John Murdoch won the resulting by-election on 17 December 1935. However, John Murdoch also died on 17 August 1936, and on 3 October 1936, Archibald Blacklow was elected to replace him.
  On 3 December 1937, William Propsting, one of the three members for Hobart and the President of the Council, died. William Strutt won the resulting by-election on 15 February 1938.
  On 24 December 1938, Alan Wardlaw, the member for South Esk, died. Leslie Procter won the resulting by-election on 7 March 1939.

Sources
 
 Parliament of Tasmania (2006). The Parliament of Tasmania from 1856

Members of Tasmanian parliaments by term
20th-century Australian politicians